This page lists notable students, alumni and faculty members of the University of Washington.

Notable alumni

Nobel laureates

Academic administration and teaching

Aeronautics and astronautics

Art and architecture

Business and law

Literature

Pulitzer Prize winners

National Book Award
 Beverly Cleary (1939) – Children's Books, Fiction, Paperback 1981
 Timothy Egan (1981) – Non-fiction 2006 for The Worst Hard Time: The Untold Story of Those Who Survived the Great American Dust Bowl

General
If no class year is listed, author may not have graduated.

Government, Politics & Diplomacy

Military

Prominent officers

Active duty
 Peter W. Chiarelli (1980) – four-star General and the Vice Chief of Staff of the United States Army
 Bruce W. Clingan (1977) – Admiral United States Navy and Commander, U.S. Naval Forces Europe Commander, U.S. Naval Forces Africa, Commander, Allied Joint Force Command, Naples

World War II
 Leslie Groves – Major General, United States Army Corps of Engineers, head of the Manhattan Project
 William H. Holloman III (August 21, 1924 - June 12, 2010), U.S. Army Air Force officer and combat fighter pilot with the Tuskegee Airmen; U.S. Air Force’s first African American helicopter pilot. University of Washington professor of Black Studies. 
 Tatsuji Suga - Lieutenant colonel, Imperial Japanese Army, commander of all prisoner-of-war (POW) and civilian internment camps in Borneo

Other
 Frank E. Garretson - Brigadier general, U.S. Marine Corps; Navy Cross recipient
 Tracy L. Garrett – Major General, first female Inspector General of the United States Marine Corps
 Harley D. Nygren (B.S. 1945, BSME 1947) – National Oceanic and Atmospheric Administration (NOAA) rear admiral, first Director of the NOAA Commissioned Officer Corps
 Kelly E. Taggart – National Oceanic and Atmospheric Administration (NOAA) rear admiral, second Director of the NOAA Commissioned Officer Corps
 Ronald R. Van Stockum - Brigadier general, Director, Marine Corps Reserve 1962-1964

Medal of Honor recipients

Religion
 Sanford Brown – social justice advocate, ordained United Methodist minister, and executive director of the Church Council of Greater Seattle

Science and technology

Social science and humanities

Sports

Olympic medal winners

Baseball

Basketball

Football

Soccer

Track and field
 Brad Walker (2003) – two-time NCAA pole vault champion; gold medalist at the 2006 World Indoor Championships and 2007 World Championships

Other sports

Music

Television, film, and other arts

Crime
 Theodore Robert Bundy – commonly known as "Ted" Bundy; serial killer, 1974–1978; admitted to killing 30 people; some sources say he could have killed as many as 100
 Amanda Knox; convicted of the murder of her roommate in Italy, conviction later overturned

Notable faculty

Nobel Laureates

Pulitzer Prize winners
 Elizabeth Bishop – Poetry, 1956
 Stephen Dunn – Poetry, 2001
 Richard Eberhart – Poetry, 1966
 Vernon Louis Parrington – History, 1928
 Theodore Roethke – Poetry, 1954

Biology and medicine

Business and law
 William R. Greiner – President of the University at Buffalo, 1991–2004
 Paul Heyne – economist and author of The Economic Way of Thinking
 Terence Mitchell – Gold member of Academy of Management Hall of Fame; one of three Gold members out of over 10,000 members

Politics and administration

Science and technology

Social science, arts, and humanities

Athletics

References

University of Washington people